The 2013 Heineken Cup Final was the final match of the 2012–13 Heineken Cup, the 18th season of Europe's top club rugby union competition. The match was played on 18 May 2013 in the Aviva Stadium in Dublin, Ireland, kicking off at 5 pm (16:00 UTC).  The all-French game was won by Toulon, defeating Clermont 16–15.

Background 
Under rules of the competition organiser, European Rugby Cup, the winner of the Heineken Cup receives an automatic entry into the following season's Heineken Cup, as does the winner of the Amlin Challenge Cup. If the Heineken Cup winner has already qualified through its domestic or regional league, the berth will normally pass to another team from its country; both Clermont and Toulon have qualified as the top two teams in the Top 14 home-and-away season. However, France is capped at seven Heineken Cup places (as is England).

The final 2013–14 Heineken Cup participant was determined by the result of the Challenge Cup Final held the previous day at the RDS Arena in Dublin. Leinster's victory over Stade Français meant that the Heineken Cup winner's berth would now pass to the seventh-placed team in Top 14, Perpignan.

Route to final 
On 6 April, Clermont defeated Montpellier 36–14 at the Stade Marcel-Michelin in the quarter-finals while Toulon defeated Leicester Tigers the following evening 21–15.  On 27 April, in the semi-finals, Clermont won 16–10 against Munster at Stade de la Mosson while Toulon beat Saracens 26–14 at Twickenham the next day.

Match 
The European Champions Village was staged in Merrion Square and was a point for all travelling supporters to congregate before the match.

Summary 
The final was an all-French clash between Clermont and Toulon.  At half-time the score was 3–3, with Toulon's Jonny Wilkinson and Clermont's Morgan Parra scoring a penalty each.  Early in the second half, Clermont scored two tries (Napolioni Nalaga and Brock James) taking the score to 15–6, but despite this, Delon Armitage's converted try resulted in a 16–15 win for Toulon.  Delon later apologized for mocking Brock James on the way to scoring the winning try, after being criticized for being unprofessional.

Details

Reaction
Wilkinson, who had turned down a place on the British and Irish Lions side to focus on his club rugby, said that winning the Heineken Cup was "right up there with winning the World Cup". The following day, Wilkinson was named European Player of the Year following his performance in the Heineken Cup.

Toulon's victory also doubled, to six, the number of players to have won titles in the premier club competitions of both the Northern and Southern Hemispheres, respectively the Heineken Cup and Super Rugby. Bakkies Botha and Danie Rossouw had won the then-Super 14 title with the Bulls in 2007, 2009, and 2010, while Matt Giteau had won the title with the Brumbies in 2004 when the competition was known as Super 12. The previous three players to have claimed both titles were Rod Kafer, Doug Howlett, and Brad Thorn.

References

External links 
 Official web site

Final
2013
Heineken Cup Final
Heineken Cup Final
ASM Clermont Auvergne matches
RC Toulonnais matches